Zeyar Shwe Myay Football Club is a Burmese football club, based at Monywa Stadium in Monywa, Myanmar. The club was a founding member of the Myanmar National League (MNL) in 2009. The club represents the Sagaing Division in central Myanmar.

Players

Notable former players
 Abubakar Yakubu

References

Zeyar Shwe Myay

External links
 Official website in Burmese

Association football clubs established in 2009
Myanmar National League clubs
2009 establishments in Myanmar
Zayar Shwe Myay F.C.
Football clubs in Myanmar